Bokaro Steel Plant (BSL) is located in the Bokaro district of Jharkhand. It is the fourth integrated public sector steel plant in India built with Soviet help. It was incorporated as a limited company in 1964. It was later merged with the state-owned Steel Authority of India Limited (SAIL).

Currently it houses five blast furnaces with a total capacity to produce 5.8 MT of liquid steel. The plant is undergoing a mass modernisation drive after which its output capacity is expected to cross 10 MT.

An upgrade of the plant was also done in the 1990s in its steel refining units and continuous casting machines. The plant has recently taken expansion plan along with Korean Steel Company, Pohang Iron and Steel Company (POSCO)[1] Initially, about 64 moujas (a mouja may have several village units) had been acquired for the plant. Of the total land acquired, only 7,765 ha was used to set up the steel plant. The rest has been given by SAIL to the private parties without government’s approval.

Products
Bokaro Steel Plant is designed to produce a wide range of products:
 Hot rolled coils
 Hot rolled plates
 Hot rolled sheets
 Cold rolled coils (CRM)
 Cold rolled sheets
 Tin mill black plates
 Galvanised plain and corrugated sheets
 Oxygen gas
 Hydrogen gas
 Coke oven byproducts

References

Further reading 
 
 

1964 establishments in Bihar
Steel plants of India
Steel Authority of India
Bokaro district
Economy of Jharkhand
India–Soviet Union relations
Soviet foreign aid